Jan-Ole Sievers (born 16 February 1995) is a German professional footballer who most recently played as a goalkeeper for 1. FC Lokomotive Leipzig.

Career
Sievers made his professional debut for 1. FC Kaiserslautern on 25 October 2017, starting in a home match in the second round of the 2017–18 DFB-Pokal against Bundesliga club VfB Stuttgart.

References

External links
 
 

1995 births
Living people
Footballers from Karlsruhe
German footballers
Association football goalkeepers
2. Bundesliga players
3. Liga players
Regionalliga players
J2 League players
1. FC Kaiserslautern II players
1. FC Kaiserslautern players
FC Gifu players
SV Elversberg players
1. FC Lokomotive Leipzig players
German expatriate footballers
German expatriate sportspeople in Japan
Expatriate footballers in Japan